Not Afraid is the debut studio album by Christian pop rock singer Stephanie Smith. It was released on May 27, 2008, through Gotee Records. The album features the radio singles "Superstar", "Not Afraid" and "Renew Me".

Track listing
"Beauty"
"Superstar"
"Not Afraid"
"Renew Me"
"You Alone"
"Waitin' On You"
"Over It"
"In My Eyes"
"What If I Made a Mistake"
"Love Out Loud"
"First Words"

References

2008 albums